The rufous paradise flycatcher (Terpsiphone cinnamomea) is a species of bird in the family Monarchidae.
It is found in Indonesia and the Philippines.
Its natural habitat is subtropical or tropical moist lowland forests.

Taxonomy and systematics
Alternate names for the rufous paradise flycatcher include the cinnamon paradise flycatcher.

Subspecies
Three subspecies are recognized:
 Luzon paradise-flycatcher (T. c. unirufa) - Salomonsen, 1937: Originally described as a separate species. Found in the northern Philippines
 T. c. cinnamomea - (Sharpe, 1877): Found in the southern Philippines
 Talaud paradise-flycatcher (T. c. talautensis) - (Meyer, AB & Wiglesworth, 1894): Originally described as a separate species. Found on the Talaud Islands (far northern Indonesia)

References

rufous paradise flycatcher
Birds of Mindanao
Endemic birds of the Philippines
rufous paradise flycatcher
Taxonomy articles created by Polbot